The Canberra light rail network, also known as Canberra Metro, is a light rail system serving the city of Canberra, Australia. The initial  line links the northern town centre of Gungahlin to the city centre (Civic) and has 14 stops. Services commenced on 20 April 2019. The 14th stop at Sandford Street in Mitchell commenced operation in September 2021.

An extension of the line south to the Woden Town Centre is currently being planned. Early works on the southern extension (Stage 2A to Commonwealth Park) are set to commence in 2021 with plans due for submission around October. Planning of the remainder of the extension (Stage 2B to Woden) will continue while construction of Stage 2A is underway.

History

Background

Walter Burley Griffin's master plan for Canberra proposed the construction of a tram network. The proposal did not eventuate and the city was exclusively served by buses from 1926, when the Canberra City Omnibus Service was introduced, until 2019.

While railways across Canberra, including one to Belconnen, were seriously considered until the mid-1960s, little discussion of a metropolitan tramway occurred until the 1990s. Prior to 1989, the ACT had been directly administered by the Federal Government thus any large public infrastructure expenditure in Canberra was subject to national scrutiny.

In the early 1990s, Canberra Land proposed a  line from Canberra Racecourse via Northbourne Avenue to Civic with Melbourne tram B2089 displayed in February 1992.

A light rail connection for Gungahlin was proposed as far back as 1992. An eight year old Canberran proposed the idea of a tram line to the newly announced, but undeveloped town centre of Gungahlin in April 1992. In October 1992 a syndicate of private land developers MBA Land and Consolidated Builders (together known as Canberra Land) incorporated rail into an urban village plan. The Gungahlin proposal followed a 1991 Murdoch University report, Towards a More Sustainable Canberra, which suggested the city was too car-oriented and should implement a light rail system along the Y-Plan. In 1993 a report by Maunsell-Denis Johnston and Associates found that a dedicated inter-town busway was a more viable transport option for Canberra than light rail.

In 1994, the ACT Government commissioned a study into light rail, based on the findings of an independent report that light rail would be viable in Canberra by 1998. In its detailed report consultants Booz Allen Hamilton recommended a route from Belconnen to Barton via the City and Kings Avenue Bridge be operating by 1998; Woden to Barton by 2000; Tuggeranong to Woden by 2002 and Gungahlin to City by 2004. Routes to Canberra Airport and Queanbeyan received a lower priority. By January 1995 the then ACT Liberal Opposition Leader, Kate Carnell, announced her party's opposition to the light rail proposal citing "suspect" patronage figures and questioned the report's projected population for Canberra-Queanbeyan of 474,000 by 2016. Projections in 2017 for the Canberra-Queanbeyan population, forecast the metropolitan area reaching 474,000 between 2020 and 2023, four to seven years later than the 1995 projections. In 1995, the ACT Liberal Party came to power and plans for a light rail system in Canberra were dropped.

In February 1998, the ACT Government announced its support for the Federation Line, a proposed  line from the National Museum of Australia via Civic to the Australian War Memorial. The line was proposed to use heritage trams.

In September 2001, to try to garner support for the project, Melbourne tram W249 and Sydney tram R2001 were placed on display outside the Australian War Memorial, the latter operating on a  section of track and being powered by a diesel generator. In a further display in September 2003, W249 operated on an  section of track on Parkes Way.

In August 2012, an ACT Government submission to Infrastructure Australia estimated that bus rapid transit (BRT) had roughly twice the benefit-cost ratio of light rail transit (LRT) under a wide range of assumptions. However, the Government decided on light rail, relying partly on a triple bottom line evaluation by URS which found that light rail had higher social benefits and a better overall outcome. Capital Metro Minister Simon Corbell responded to criticism by stating "City building is about more than simply economic logarithms."

Development
The construction of the light rail line was part of a deal struck between the Labor Party and The Greens following the 2012 Australian Capital Territory Election, at which Labor required Greens support to form government. In the 2013/14 ACT budget, $5 million was allocated for early design work. In September 2014, the business case was approved by the government. The project, known as Capital Metro during planning, was developed by the government agency Capital Metro Agency (CMA).

The line was to be delivered under a public private partnership. Expressions of interest were received from the following consortia:
ACTivate: Downer Group, Plenary Group, Bombardier and Keolis Downer
Canberra Metro: Pacific Partnerships, Mitsubishi Corporation, John Holland, CAF, Deutsche Bahn, Aberdeen Asset Management, Leighton Contractors, and Bank of Tokyo-Mitsubishi
CANGO: Macquarie Capital Group, Obrascon Huarte Lain, SMRT International, UGL Rail and Siemens
Connecting Canberra: Capella Capital, Transdev, Alstom and Acciona Infrastructure

In March 2015, the government announced that ACTivate and Canberra Metro had been selected to move on to the Request for Proposal stage of the procurement process. The bidders submitted their final proposals for the Gungahlin to the city route on 4 September and had an additional four weeks to submit their proposals for a potential expansion of the project, from the city to Russell. The Canberra Metro consortium was announced as the preferred tenderer in February 2016 and the contract was finalised in May. Under the contract, Canberra Metro will operate and maintain the line for 20 years, after which ownership will pass to the ACT Government.

Design and construction costs was budgeted at $707 million. The Federal Government contributed $67 million to the project. Commencement of construction was marked by a sod-turning in the northern suburb of Mitchell at the site of the depot on 12 July 2016. Major construction of the route itself began towards the end of the year.

The opposition Liberal Party opposed the project, so did the Like Canberra and Sustainable Australia parties. In April 2015, the party announced it would cancel any contracts for the light rail if it won the 2016 ACT election. A year out from the poll, the light rail project was already predicted to be the election's major issue. As predicted, the light rail project was the major issue of the campaign. The election saw the Labor government returned, with the party claiming the result as an endorsement of the project.

The CMA was amalgamated into a new government directorate, the Transport Canberra & City Services (TCCS), on 1 July 2016, resulting in the responsibility for the project transferred to the TCCS.

Testing of the line began in June 2018. A section in Gungahlin was electrified and one of the trams made trial runs. All 14 trams have arrived in Canberra and it was hoped to have the project completed by the end of 2018. The light rail eventually opened on 20 April 2019, with the final construction cost for Stage 1 being $675 million, some $32 million under the original budget.

Route

The  line has its northern terminus at Hibberson Street in Gungahlin, and follows Flemington Road, the Federal Highway and Northbourne Avenue to the southern terminus between Alinga and Rudd Streets in the City Centre. It is double track for its full length. Emergency crossovers are located to the south of the Dickson Interchange stop, as well as the north of the Nullarbor Avenue stop. There are 14 stops. The main bus interchanges are located at Gungahlin Place, Dickson Interchange and Alinga Street.

[
{
  "type": "ExternalData",
  "service": "page",
  "title": "Canberra light rail - Gungahlin to City.map"
},
{
  "type": "ExternalData",
  "service": "page",
  "title": "Canberra light rail - Gungahlin to City stops.map"
}
]

Stops

The Sandford Street light rail stop commenced construction in 2020 and opened on 16 September 2021.

Operation

The service is operated by Canberra Metro Operations (CMET), in association with Deutsche Bahn Engineering and Consulting, under a 20-year contract. CMET is a joint venture between John Holland and Pacific Partnerships, both of whom are part of the Canberra Metro consortium.

CMET holds the contract to operate the light rail until at least 2036. Formed in 2016, it is a partnership between John Holland and Pacific Partnerships in association with Deutsche Bahn Engineering and Consulting. CMET commenced operations on 20 April 2019 with the completion of the first stage of the project.

CMET is part of the Canberra Metro Consortium, acting as the operations component of the group, with both its owners also being equity providers. CMET does not actually contract with the ACT Government, rather it contracts with Canberra Metro PC Pty Limited (Canberra Metro) to provide service on its lines, who then contract with the Canberra Metro Agency to manage the project and provide services to the city.

The contract specifies the following minimum service levels for hours of operation and service frequency:

Rolling stock

14 CAF built Urbos 3 trams operate on the system. CAF will also provide twenty years of maintenance for the fleet. There are four doors on each side of the vehicle, two single leaf and two double leaf doors. The first tram was delivered in December 2017. The vehicles feature a red and grey livery, with white reflective stripe in the middle. The depot is located in Mitchell.

Control system
Tehnika's t-visor RAIL platform, also used on the Gold Coast Light Rail, provides the operators with a single, centralised control system. This encompasses the automatic vehicle location, traffic signalling priority, traction power & infrastructure SCADA, CCTV and passenger information systems, amongst others.

Potential extensions

The consortia participating in the procurement process for the initial line were asked to develop plans for an expanded route from the City Centre to the Defence headquarters in Russell via London Circuit and Constitution Avenue. This additional  section was estimated to boost the patronage of the line as a whole by more than 30%. The proposal highlighted the desire of the Federal Government's National Capital Authority to use wire-free technology to power the trams in areas of the city under the authority's management. The ACT Government decided not to proceed with the expanded route, but committed to releasing a plan for a second stage of the light rail network prior to the October 2016 territory election. It was considering extending the line not only to Russell but to the broader parliamentary triangle, possibly including Canberra Airport and the Australian National University.

Stage 2: Civic to Woden
In July 2016, the government released a shortlist of four potential routes that could form the second stage of the light rail network. The routes were:
 City to Canberra Airport via Constitution Avenue & Parkes Way
 City to Belconnen Town Centre via Barry Drive past Calvary Hospital & the University of Canberra
 City to the Parliamentary Triangle via either Commonwealth Avenue or Kings Avenue
 City to Mawson via Woden.

In September 2016, the government selected a truncated version of the Mawson route that ends at Woden as its preferred second stage project. Tenders to design various aspects of the project were called in November. At that stage the only firm decisions the government had made about the route were that it would run from Alinga Street to the Woden Town Centre and use Commonwealth Avenue Bridge to cross Lake Burley Griffin. More concrete plans were released in May 2017. South of Lake Burley Griffin, the route will predominantly travel via Adelaide Avenue and Yarra Glen. Design options for several sections of the route that had yet to be locked in were presented to the public for comment. An option that would have extended the route to the Canberra Hospital was dropped in December 2017.

There were two options for the section between Lake Burley Griffin and Adelaide Avenue: a deviation to Barton with proposed stops at Old Parliament House, Brisbane Avenue and Sydney Avenue; or a more direct route via the Capital Circle. The longer route via Barton was selected by the ACT Government as the preferred route in April 2018. In March 2019, the Commonwealth Government offered its support for the extension to Woden, however it favoured a different path around Capital Hill, arguing for a route along the State Circle. A delay in the federal government response meant planning work for the line was postponed, though choosing to not pursue the Barton route could mean a simpler regulatory process. The ACT Government is now investigating the State Circle route, which involves some technical challenges due to steep gradients for light rail.

When construction of stage 1 began, construction of stage 2 was planned to begin shortly after the completion of the first stage. The Federal Government will be invited to make a contribution to the project as part of the government's City Deals program.

In July 2019, the new ACT Transport minister Chris Steel announced that stage 2 would be divided into 2 parts, 2A to stop before Lake Burley Griffin at Commonwealth Park and 2B to continue across the lake to Woden.

In mid July 2019, the ACT Government submitted a referral to the Australian Department of Environment and Energy for stage 2A, covering the extension from Civic to Commonwealth Park as well as an expansion of the depot in Mitchell. In September, the ACT Government approved the business case for stage 2A, confirming the three new stops on the route which will also require London Circuit being raised at Commonwealth Avenue where the light rail will travel. According to the stage 2A business case, from the Alinga Street Stop to the Commonwealth Park Stop will be about 6 minutes. The signing of contracts for stage 2A was delayed in 2020 due to the COVID-19 pandemic.

In mid July 2019, the ACT Government submitted a referral to the Australian Department of Environment and Energy for stage 2B, covering the extension from Commonwealth Park to Woden.

Stage 3: Belconnen to Canberra Airport
In October 2019, the ACT Government released its infrastructure plan which included stage 3 of light rail going from Belconnen to Canberra Airport via Civic, with the Civic–Belconnen section built first.

Stage 4: Woden to Tuggeranong
In October 2019, the ACT Government released its infrastructure plan which included stage 4 extending from Woden to Tuggeranong via Mawson.

Twenty-five year vision
In October 2015, the ACT Government released a plan for a citywide light rail network that would be built over a period of twenty-five years. The plan includes the following elements:

References

External links

Transport Canberra - Light Rail

Deutsche Bahn
Light rail in Australia
Canberra Metro
Transport in Canberra
2019 establishments in Australia
750 V DC railway electrification